Parelloop (Pearl Run in English) is an annual 10 kilometres road running competition usually held in late March or early April in Brunssum, Netherlands. The inaugural edition was held in 1989.

In 2009, Micah Kogo broke the world record for the 10 km road distance, previously held by Haile Gebrselassie. Since the mid-1990s, the competition has been dominated by Kenyan athletes, with only three winners coming from outside the East African nation since 1999.

Winners
Key:

References

External links 
 Official website

10K runs
Athletics competitions in the Netherlands
Recurring sporting events established in 1989
Sports competitions in Limburg (Netherlands)
Sport in Brunssum